Haithem Ben Alayech (born June 10, 1989 in Mornag), also spelled Haitem, is an amateur Tunisian freestyle wrestler who played for the men's welterweight category. Ben Alayech represented Tunisia at the 2012 Summer Olympics in London, where he competed for the men's 66 kg class. Unfortunately, he did not show up in the qualifying round match against Canada's Haislan Garcia, allowing his opponent to be given a free pass for the next round.

References

External links
 
 
 Haitem Ben Alayech at NBC 2008 Olympics website 

1989 births
Living people
People from Ben Arous Governorate
Tunisian male sport wrestlers
Olympic wrestlers of Tunisia
Wrestlers at the 2012 Summer Olympics
21st-century Tunisian people